Bounou is a town in the Yaba Department of Nayala Province in north-western Burkina Faso. The town has a population of 3,145.

References

Populated places in the Boucle du Mouhoun Region
Nayala Province